Jack Merton Sales (30 March 1925 – 29 September 2007) was an Australian rules footballer who played with Collingwood in the Victorian Football League (VFL).

World War II
Sales enlisted in the Royal Australian Air Force three weeks after turning 18 and served until the end of World War II.

Football
After demobilization, Sales joined Sandringham for the 1946 VFA season, and played on a wing in their premiership winning side that year. In 1947, Sales again appeared in a VFA Grand Final, this time on a losing side as Sandringham lost to Port Melbourne.

In 1948 Sandringham refused him a clearance to Collingwood, but he received a permit from the VFL and transferred to Collingwood. He played a total of 31 games over his two seasons with Collingwood before moving to a playing-coach role with Hamilton Imperials.

Death
Sales died at Frankston on 29 September 2007 and was cremated at Bunurong Memorial Park.

Notes

External links 

Jack Sales's playing statistics from The VFA Project
Jack Sales's profile on Collingwood Forever

1925 births
2007 deaths
Australian rules footballers from Melbourne
Collingwood Football Club players
Sandringham Football Club players
People from Brighton, Victoria
Royal Australian Air Force personnel of World War II
Military personnel from Melbourne
Burials in Victoria (Australia)